The first season of Idol Puerto Rico premiered on August 7, 2011 and continued until November 21, 2011. It was won by Christian Pagán. The season was hosted by Jaime Augusto Mayol. The winner, Christian Pagán, signed with Universal Music Group, the label in partnership with Idol Puerto Rico, and has released two albums.

Selection process

Auditions
The show selected contestants from two auditions held on May 7, 2011 in the Juan Pachín Vicéns Auditorium at Ponce and May 14, 2011 in the Hiram Bithorn Stadium at San Juan; those auditions were presented on August 7 and August 9, 2011, respectively.

Theater level

The "Theater Level" auditions were broadcast on August 15, 2011 on a special program called Idol Puerto Rico - Theatre Edition. During this audition, the 80 contestants sang individually in front of the judges. They were then evaluated in groups of eight to gradually reduce the number. Those selected got to choose a partner to sing a duet. The jury listened each pair and eliminated several contestants. For the final round of this stage of the competition, the contestants sang solo one more time. In the end, the judges chose the twenty-four semifinalists.

Semi-finals

The semi-finals began with a total of 24 contestants. They were broadcast on August 29–30, 2011. After the semi-finals, 12 of the contestants were eliminated, leaving the remaining 12 for the Finals.

Finalists

Finals

The finals began on September 12, 2011 with 12 contestants, and lasted 10 weeks. One finalist was eliminated per week based on the public's votes.

Final Gala: November 21, 2011

Elimination chart

References

External links
Official website

2011 Puerto Rican television seasons